OJSC Mosmetrostroy (abbr. of "Moscow Metro Construction [Department]") is a major Russian construction company, which deals with solving engineering problems related to performance of a wide range of under and above-ground works. The company is the successor of the Metrostroy Department formed in 1931 to set a new branch of construction industry — metro and tunnel construction. In eight decades Mosmetrostroy has constructed 180 metro stations in Moscow along with implementing its projects throughout the post-Soviet space and abroad. At the present moment Mosmetrostroy acts as general contractor building metro stations in Moscow and has won a contract to construct a segment of Mumbai Metro Rail's underground line. via a joint venture with Hindustan Construction Company Ltd.

Earlier it had been awarded two contract packages to performing tunnelling and station construction in consortium with Gammon India Ltd. in Chennai, India. However it abandoned the Chennai Metro Rail project partway through after its requests for cost escalation were denied. The contract was terminated, and the subsequent court case allowed re-tendering of the remaining work to other vendors

See also 

 Moscow Metro
 Mumbai Metro
 Chennai Metro
 High-speed railway to Jerusalem

References

Construction and civil engineering companies of Russia
Companies based in Moscow
1931 establishments in the Soviet Union
Construction and civil engineering companies established in 1931